The Kent City School District is a public school district based in Kent, Ohio, United States. It serves approximately 3,100 students living in Kent, Franklin Township, Brady Lake, and Sugar Bush Knolls, as well as a small portion of southern Streetsboro.  The district has seven schools including four elementary schools housing kindergarten through fifth grade with preschool housed at one elementary school; Stanton Middle School for grades 6–8; and Theodore Roosevelt High School, which houses grades 9–12. The superintendent is George Joseph, who began his tenure in July 2014 after working as Executive Director of Administrative Services for the Worthington City School District in Worthington, Ohio. The district offices are located in the historic and former DePeyster School on North DePeyster Street in Kent.

History 
The district was formed around 1860 by merging several smaller one-room school house districts into one centralized district for the village. As Kent was still known as Franklin Mills, the district was originally known as the "Franklin Union School District".  The district would continue to be known as a "Franklin Union" district even after residents voted to change the name of the village from Franklin Mills to Kent in 1864. During the 1860s, the district began to divide the students in the school houses by grade level. As a result of the curriculum and management changes, the district elected to close the schoolhouses and erect a centralized building for all grades. Although initially planned for 1868, construction delays prevented the building from opening until March 1869. During the school year leading up to the opening of the new building, which would initially be known as the "Union School" and later as "Central School," students in the high school grades were housed at the Franklin Township Hall in Kent while all other grades remained at their respective school house. The building would serve as the home of all students until growth in the community necessitated the construction of two additional elementary schools: South School in 1880 and DePeyster School in 1888. Even with the new schools, the original Union/Central building would be the home of Kent High School until 1922.

As Kent continued to grow throughout the twentieth century, new schools and changes became necessary. A new high school was built in 1922 and was named in honor of Theodore Roosevelt. The original Union School continued to be used as an elementary school  known as Central School until 1953 when a new Central Elementary School was constructed on its predecessor's front yard. Following the completion of the new school, the Union School building was torn down. Additional elementary schools followed first with the construction of Longcoy Elementary School on the city's west side. By 1958 the high school had outgrown its facility, so a new high school building was built on the north side of the city. It retained the name of Theodore Roosevelt and the former high school building was rechristened as Davey Junior High School in the fall of 1959 when the new high school opened. 1959 also saw the merging of the Franklin Local School District and the Brady Lake School District into the Kent City Schools, which added two more elementary schools: Franklin Elementary and Emma Williard (Brady Lake) Elementary. The 1960s saw the last elementary schools built in Kent with the opening of Holden Elementary in 1965 on the city's south side and Walls Elementary on the east side in 1966.  Most of South School was razed in 1966 following the completion of Holden except for the building's gym which was leased to the Kent Parks and Recreation Department and used as the Kent Recreation Center.  Enrollment growth through the 1960s and into the 1970s resulted in additions at Walls School, Davey Junior High School, and Roosevelt High School.  Also in 1970, the district entered into a cooperative agreement with the Stow-Munroe Falls, Cuyahoga Falls, Woodridge, Tallmadge, and Hudson school districts to provide vocational education.  This compact, known as the Six District Compact, was the first of its kind in the state of Ohio.  In 1978, ninth graders were moved from Davey to Roosevelt, Emma Williard School was closed, and the school board moved into offices in the renovated DePeyster School building.

Facilities

* = enrollment and faculty numbers as of the 2018–19 school year

See also
History of Kent, Ohio

References

External links

Kent City School District official website
Kent City School District state report cards

School districts in Ohio
Education in Portage County, Ohio
Kent, Ohio
School districts established in 1860